Syringa pinetorum is a species in the genus Syringa, in the family Oleaceae.

Description 

Height/spread: Shrub reaching up to 1-3m high and wide at maturity.
Stems: Cylindrical branchlets range from villous to puberulent (with fine, minute hairs), gradually becoming glabrescent.
Leaves: Ovate to ovate-lanceolate or lanceolate, measuring 1.5-2.5 (occasionally up to 4) cm x 0.8-2 (occasionally 3) cm, papery, subglabrous or sparsely pubescent above, glabrescent below or pilose along veins. Apex is acute to acuminate, base cuneate to broadly cuneate.
Flowers: Panicles are lateral, erect, and loose, and measure 4-16 (occasionally as much as 20) cm x 3-8 (occasionally 10) cm. Pedicel to 3mm in length, and may be either pubescent or glabrous. Calyx, reaching 1.5-3mm, pedicel, to 3mm, and rachis are usually puberulent. Corolla pale red or lilac, measuring 1-1.5 (rarely to 2) cm. Tube is cylindric, and measures 6-10 (occasionally up to 15) mm. Lobes are elliptic to ovate and spreading. Anthers are yellow and are inserted to 3mm beyond the mouth of the corolla tube. Flowers May–July.
Fruit: Capsule is lanceolate to long elliptic and is nearly smooth, measuring 0.8-1.5 cm in length. Fruits July–September.

Habitat 

Valleys under pines, 2200-3600m altitude.

Distribution 

China: Sichuan, southeastern Tibet (Xizang), and northwestern Yunnan provinces.

Cultivation 

Not yet known in cultivation.

Etymology 
Pinetorum, meaning 'associated with pines, of pine woods' from the genitive plural of pinus. Syringa is derived from the Greek word syrinx, meaning 'pipe' or 'tube'. Named for the use of its hollow stems to make flutes. In Greek mythology, the nymph Syringa was changed into a reed.

References 

pinetorum
Flora of China
Flora of Tibet